The men's middleweight boxing competition at the 2016 Summer Olympics in Rio de Janeiro was held from 8 to 20 August at the Riocentro.

Schedule 
All times are Brasília Time (UTC−3).

Results

Finals

Top half

Bottom half

1 O'Reilly was ejected from the competition after being suspended when a sample he provided prior to coming to Rio tested positive for a banned substance.

References

Boxing at the 2016 Summer Olympics
Men's events at the 2016 Summer Olympics